Selma Silajdžić ( Muhedinović; born 6 June 1972) is a Bosnian former pop singer, famous in Bosnia and Herzegovina in the late 1990s and early 2000s.

Biography
Although establishing a promising pop music career in the late 1990s and early 2000s, Muhedinović retired in 2006. Her present day hobbies include playing violin and doing yoga.

Muhedinović had reportedly been in a relationship with Bosnian politician and former Presidency member Haris Silajdžić for over fifteen years when they married on 8 March 2016. Silajdžić said that their mutual tendency towards art, his being poetry and hers being music, was what initially sparked their attraction. They live in Sarajevo.

Discography
Uzmi ili ostavi (1998)
Tebi suđena (2003)
Moje Sarajevo (2005)
Novi dan (2006)

References

External links
Selma Muhedinović at Discogs

1972 births
Living people
Musicians from Sarajevo
Bosniaks of Bosnia and Herzegovina
Bosnia and Herzegovina Muslims
21st-century Bosnia and Herzegovina women singers
Bosnia and Herzegovina folk-pop singers
Hayat Production artists
20th-century Bosnia and Herzegovina women singers